Shoushan stone carving is an art originating in Fujian Province in East China.

The stones used in carving are also known as agalmatolite and are mined in the Shoushan village in northern Fujian. Use of the stone for carving can be traced back as far as the Southern dynasties and have long been used to produce handicrafts and later on in the Ming dynasty, seals.

See also
 Shou (character), meaning longevity

External links
 A Mineralogical and Petrographical Study of Shoushan Stone (Agalmatolite)

Chinese sculpture
Fujian